Siôn Phylip (1543–1620) was a Welsh language poet from the Ardudwy region of Gwynedd. In 1568, Sion was ordained as a master poet at the second Caerwys Eisteddfod.

One of his works was en elegy composed for the poet Morus Dwyfech.

References

1543 births
1620 deaths
Welsh-language poets
Welsh Eisteddfod winners
16th-century Welsh writers
16th-century male writers
17th-century Welsh writers
17th-century male writers
17th-century Welsh poets
16th-century Welsh poets